Fikrun wa Fann (German: Art and Thought) was a biannual multilingual cultural magazine, focusing on cultural exchange between Germany and the Muslim world, published during its final years by the German cultural organization Goethe Institute. Founded in 1963 the last issue was published in Fall 2016.

History and profile
Fikrun wa Fann was established in 1963. The founders were historian Albert Theile and Orientalist scholar Annemarie Schimmel. The magazine was owned and published first by the cultural organization Inter Nationes in Bonn, and later by the Goethe Institute. During the initial period the magazine was printed near Hamburg. Fikrun wa Fann was originally started in Arabic and German, but later expanded to include editions in Persian and English languages.

Fikrun wa Fann featured articles about the cultural dialogue between German society and Muslim societies. The goal was to contribute to the dialogue between these cultures through articles, photostories and editorials by German as well as authors from Islamic countries. In particular, it covered articles concerning the art, culture and socio-political issues related to German and Muslim societies.

From 1963 to 1982 (Nr. 37) the magazine was edited by its founders, Albert Theile and Annemarie Schimmel. They were replaced by Turkologist and journalist Erdmute Heller from issue no. 38. In 2001 Islamologist Stefan Weidner became the editor-in-chief of the magazine. In 2016, the magazine's no 105 was its last issue. Many of the articles in four languages are available on the webpage of Fikrun wa Fann.

References

External links
 Official website

1963 establishments in West Germany
2016 disestablishments in Germany
Biannual magazines published in Germany
Cultural magazines
Defunct political magazines published in Germany
Magazines established in 1963
Magazines disestablished in 2016
Magazines published in Hamburg
Multilingual magazines
Goethe-Institut